Reem Omar Frainah, most commonly known as Reem Frainah, is a Palestinian human rights activist. She is also the executive director of Aisha Association for Woman and Child Protection.

Biography 
Reem Frainah has worked in the field of women's and children's protection in Palestine since 1993. Besides her activism, she studied mathematics at university. After finishing her bachelor, she worked as a teacher in elementary School. Through a one-year training course at the Gaza Community Mental Health Program (GCMHP), she got in touch with Eyad al-Sarraj. Through him, she got interested in psychology, and in 2011, she finished her Master of Arts in Psychology at Al-Azhar University – Gaza. Her dissertation focused on "the trends towards religious commitment and its relationship with marital adjustment of a sample of couples in Gaza city."

One of the programs within the GCMHP evolved into  Aisha Association for Woman and Child Protection (AISHA), an independent Palestinian women organization working to achieve gender integration through economic empowerment and psychosocial support to marginalized groups in the Gaza Strip with focus on Gaza City and the North area. When AISHA became as an independent institution in 2009, Frainah was appointed as its Program Coordinator. She later on became the executive director of AISHA in 2013.

Most of her works include teaching, and providing a variety of services to the most marginalized women and children in Gaza. She has also written articles, studies and working papers, and participated in seminars on the subject, and organized workshops with different actors, like representatives from the Palestinian government, the Bank of Palestine, Deutsche Gesellschaft für Internationale Zusammenarbeit among others.

References

Palestinian human rights activists
Palestinian women's rights activists
Living people
Year of birth missing (living people)